The three-toed parrotbill (Cholornis paradoxus) is a species of parrotbill in the family Paradoxornithidae.
It is endemic to central China.
Its natural habitat is temperate forests.

References

Sources
Robson, C. (2007). Family Paradoxornithidae (Parrotbills) pp. 292–321 in; del Hoyo, J., Elliott, A. & Christie, D.A. eds. Handbook of the Birds of the World, Vol. 12. Picathartes to Tits and Chickadees. Lynx Edicions, Barcelona.

three-toed parrotbill
Birds of Central China
Endemic birds of China
three-toed parrotbill
Taxonomy articles created by Polbot